Warsaw Academy is a historic school in Warsaw, Wyoming County, New York.  It is a two-story cobblestone structure measuring 35 feet by 57 feet in the Greek Revival style.  Built as a school in 1846, the building has housed a Masonic temple since 1907.  A two-story brick wing was added in 1854 and a one-story stucco wing was added in 1928.

It was listed on the National Register of Historic Places in 1980.

References

External links
Warsaw History, Tour 5:Main Street Tour, Warsaw, NY
Warsaw Academy - Warsaw, New York - U.S. National Register of Historic Places on Waymarking.com

School buildings on the National Register of Historic Places in New York (state)
Greek Revival architecture in New York (state)
Masonic buildings in New York (state)
Cobblestone architecture
School buildings completed in 1846
Buildings and structures in Wyoming County, New York
National Register of Historic Places in Wyoming County, New York